The 1st Weather Group (1 WXG) is a group of the United States Air Force. It oversees all six operational weather squadrons; the 15th OWS at Scott AFB, Ill.; the 17th OWS at Joint Base Pearl Harbor–Hickam, Hawaii; the 21st OWS at Kapaun Air Station, Germany; the 25th OWS at Davis-Monthan AFB, Ariz.; the 26th OWS at Barksdale AFB, La.; and the 28th OWS at Shaw AFB, SC. The 1st WXG is a subordinate of the 557th Weather Wing.

Mission
"Provide accurate, timely, and relevant weather analyses, forecasts, warnings and briefings to Air Force, Army, Guard, Reserve, and Combatant Command forces operating in the continental United States."

"Provide initial qualification and up-grade training for weather forecaster apprentices and new weather officers."

Personnel and resources
The 1st Weather Group is part of the 557th Weather Wing's worldwide organizational force of more than 1,100 professionals. The 1st WXG manning consists of active duty, reserve, civilian and contract personnel and is headquartered on Offutt Air Force Base, Neb.

Organization
The 1st Weather Group is organized into six squadrons. Each of the squadrons produces forecasts for a specified area of the world. The squadrons also serve as training hubs for new weather professionals – both enlisted and officers.

Subordinate units
 15th Operational Weather Squadron, Scott Air Force Base, Illinois
 17th Operational Weather Squadron, Joint Base Pearl Harbor–Hickam, Hawaii
 21st Operational Weather Squadron, Kapaun Air Station, Germany
 25th Operational Weather Squadron, Davis-Monthan Air Force Base, Arizona
 26th Operational Weather Squadron, Barksdale Air Force Base, Louisiana
 28th Operational Weather Squadron, Shaw Air Force Base, South Carolina

History
The 1st Weather Group starts as the Far East Air Forces Weather Group in October 1944. In September 1945, the 1st WXG was assigned to the 43rd Weather Wing and later that year to the Headquarters Army Air Forces Weather Service. They were inactivated in 1948, and reactivated and assigned to the Air Weather Service at Offutt AFB through the Military Air Transport Service from 1952 to 1956, after which they were again inactivated. The group reactivated once again under the 1st Weather Wing from 1966 to 1972 at Tan Son Nhut AB, Vietnam. The most recent period of activation was at Fort McPherson, Ga., from 1992 to 1994 under the Air Combat Command.

The Group was distinguished with service and campaign streamers from World War II and Vietnam. They also earned four outstanding unit awards and the Republic of Vietnam Gallantry Cross.

The realignment began with the reactivation of the 1st Weather Group, at Offutt AFB, Neb., 25 May. The 1st WXG continues its long and decorated history of providing weather products and service to Air Force and Army units, and is now part of the Air Force Weather Agency.

The 15th Operational Weather Squadron, Scott Air Force Base, Illinois, was the first operational weather squadron to align under the newly formed 1st WXG during a ceremony 25 May 2006. The 26th Operational Weather Squadron was realigned at Barksdale Air Force Base on 22 June 2006.  Next was the 25th Operational Weather Squadron at Davis-Monthan Air Force Base on 6 July 2006, and the last 2006 addition to the team was the 9th Operational Weather Squadron which was reactivated on 20 July 2006 at Shaw Air ForceBase. The 9th was subsequently inactivated on 31 May 2008.  When the Air Force Weather Agency became the 557th Weather Wing in March 2015, three more OWSs aligned under the group: the 17th Operational Weather Squadron at Joint Base Pearl Harbor–Hickam; the 21st Operational Weather Squadron at Kapaun Air Station, Germany; and the 28th Operational Weather Squadron at Shaw AFB.

Lineage
 Constituted as the 1st Weather Group on 29 August 1945
 Activated on 20 September 1945
 Inactivated on 31 May 1948
 Activated on 8 July 1966
 Inactivated on 30 June 1972
 Activated on 15 June 1992
 Inactivated on 1 July 1994
 Activated on 3 May 2006

Assignments
 43rd Weather Wing, 20 September 1945 – 31 May 1948
 Air Weather Service, 20 April 1952 – 8 October 1956
 1st Weather Wing, 8 July 1966 – 30 June 1972
 Air Combat Command, 15 June 1992 – 1 July 1996
 Air Force Weather Agency (later 557th Weather Wing), 3 May 2006 – present

Stations
 Manila, Philippines, 20 September 1945 – 31 May 1948
 Offutt Air Force Base, Nebraska, 20 April 1952 – 8 October 1956
 Tan Son Nhut Airport (later Tan Son Nhut Air Base), 8 July 1966 – 30 June 1972
 Langley Air Force Base, Virginia, 15 June 1992
 Fort McPherson, Georgia, c. 1993 – 1 July 1996
 Offutt Air Force Base, Nebraska, 3 May 2006 – present

See also
List of United States Air Force weather squadrons

References
 Explanatory notes

 Citations

Bibliography

External links
 Official website
 Official factsheet
 Informational Article
 15OWS Factsheet
 25OWS Factsheet
 26OWS Factsheet
 Official Fact Sheet
 15th Operational Weather Squadron Fact Sheet
 25th Operational Weather Squadron Fact Sheet
 26th Operational Weather Squadron Fact Sheet

Military units and formations in Nebraska
Group 001
Weather 001
Military units and formations established in 1945